Sudano is a surname of Italian origin. Notable people with the surname include:

Amanda Sudano (born 1982), American singer-songwriter
Brooklyn Sudano (born 1981), American actress
Bruce Sudano (born 1948), American singer-songwriter

Italian-language surnames